Yanchep is an outer coastal suburb of Perth, Western Australia,  north of the Perth CBD. It is a part of the City of Wanneroo local government area. Originally a small crayfishing settlement, it was developed by entrepreneur Alan Bond in the 1970s for the 1977 America's Cup. The area covers the urban centre of Yanchep as well as Yanchep National Park in its entirety.

Geography
Yanchep is bounded to the north-west by Two Rocks and to the south by the rural localities of Eglinton, Carabooda and Pinjar. The non-metropolitan Shires of Gingin and Chittering surround Yanchep's northern and eastern boundaries. West of Yanchep is the Indian Ocean.

Despite this, Yanchep's urban concentration is almost entirely located in an enclave generally centred around the intersection of Marmion Avenue and Yanchep Beach Road, near the coast.

History

For thousands of years prior to the arrival of Europeans, the Yanchep area was inhabited by the Indigenous Australian Noongar people, and was a noted hunting site. The name Yanchep was adapted from the Noongar word "Yandjip", or "Yanget", which is their name for the bulrush reed that is common in the wetlands of the area. After European occupation, the land now occupied by Yanchep was being used as a sheep station.

The first houses in the area were built in 1972, and the marina at nearby Two Rocks was built as part of the same project two years later. However, sales of homes in the area had already slowed down by 1974. In 1977, the project was bought out by Tokyu Corporation after Bond Corporation began experiencing financial difficulties.

In the Western Australian State Government's "Directions 2031" urban expansion plan, Yanchep was once again highlighted as a future satellite city and major metropolitan centre.

The Smorgon family is developing the north coastal area Capricorn Beach as a planned development.

On 11 December 2019, a fire that started in Yanchep burnt over several days through about 14,000 ha across Two Rocks and into the Shire of Gingin. Approximately 6,000 homes were saved, with only one being lost. The original Yanchep petrol station, owned by local Yanchep residents, was destroyed in the fire. The once-thriving small business has been referred to as an icon of old Yanchep.

Demographics

The Australian Bureau of Statistics has identified Yanchep and Two Rocks as a significant urban area experiencing rapid growth.

As of the 2021 Australian census, Yanchep had a population of 11,022, up from the 2032 persons recorded at the 2001 census. The population is predicted to continue growing rapidly, hitting 20,702 in 2031. 57% were born in Australia, below the national average of 66.9%. Like many other northern suburbs of Perth, a significant British minority is present, with 17.5% listing England as their country of birth at the 2021 census.

The population share an average age of 35, close to the national average of 38. Income levels in Yanchep are near the Australian national average, with a median household income of $1,699 per week compared to $1,746 per week nationally.

In 2021, 53.2% of residents declared following no religion. This is in contrast to 2011, where 46.5% of Yanchep had residents declared a denomination of Christianity as their religious affiliation, with Anglicanism being the most populous at 24.5%. At the time 30.6% had declared no religion.

Amenities and facilities
As a suburb, Yanchep has a shopping centre with a large Woolworths, various specialty shops such as a newsagency, butcher, bakery, hair salon, travel agency, cafe, massage and nail salons and fast food outlets. A garden centre, vet and various other businesses are also located in the industrial area a few hundred metres from the shopping centre. Residents can also rely on Butler, Clarkson and Joondalup, 15–30 km south, for more shops and public services.

Yanchep is a popular tourist destination. With the Yanchep lagoon, Yanchep Inn in the National Park.

Yanchep National Park includes guided tours of Crystal Cave, bush walks, koala displays, and the Loch McNess lake. During the 1980s the area was home to popular tourist attractions including Atlantis Marine Park (in Two Rocks) and the Sun City Marina.

While there is no hospital at Yanchep, the area has a medical facility, and also has one large dedicated aged care facility with 160 high care beds available, reducing the need for travel for local families.

Education

There are currently four schools in Yanchep: Yanchep Beach Primary School, Yanchep Rise Primary School, Yanchep Lagoon Primary School and Yanchep Secondary College.

From 1975 to 2014, Yanchep District High School was the only school in Yanchep. It opened for Kindergarten to Year 7 students in 1975, later expanding to Year 10 in 1981. The school served Yanchep, Two Rocks, Carabooda and Woodridge.

In 2014, Yanchep Beach Primary School opened, catering for students from kindergarten to Year 6. It is an independent public school.

In 2018, Yanchep Secondary College opened for students from Year 7 to 11, expanding to Year 12 the following year, replacing Yanchep District High School as the local secondary school, and giving Year 11's and 12's living in Yanchep and Two Rocks the option of attending school nearby. Before Yanchep Secondary College opened, Year 11's and 12's had to travel to Mindarie Senior College or Butler College to access schooling. Yanchep District High School became a K-6 school and was renamed to Yanchep Lagoon Primary School.

A third primary school, Yanchep Rise Primary School, opened in 2021.

Transport
Yanchep Beach Road, one of the suburb's main distributor roads, links to Marmion Avenue and Wanneroo Road, two north-south arterial roads that link Yanchep to the rest of metropolitan Perth. Marmion Avenue was extended to Yanchep in 2008; Wanneroo Road was the only route to Yanchep from Perth prior to the extension.

Two bus routes serve Yanchep, running from Two Rocks to Butler railway station, 10 kilometres to the south in Butler. It is the nearest public transport hub to Yanchep, providing further bus and rail links to the regional city of Joondalup, as well as Perth's central business district.

 - Butler to Two Rocks via Yanchep
 - Butler to Yanchep

In the 2017 WA state budget, $441 million was allocated to build the extension, with construction having started in late 2019. When the extension opens, a journey time of 49 minutes is envisioned from Yanchep to the CBD, with up to 13,500 people expected to use the line every day.

Politics
Like many other northern Perth suburbs, Yanchep's population generally supports the Liberal Party at the federal level, but the Labor Party at the state level. There was considerable support for One Nation in that party's early days, and The Greens now have significant backing.

References

External links

 
Suburbs of Perth, Western Australia
Suburbs of the City of Wanneroo